The 6th constituency of the Nord is a French legislative constituency in the Nord département.

Description

Nord's 6th constituency lies in the centre of the department and reaches both its northern border with Belgium and its southern border with Pas-de-Calais. It covers the largely rural areas between Lille and Valenciennes.

Historically the seat has swung between left and right, however from 1993 to 2017 it was held continuously by the Gaullist Thierry Lazaro.

Historic Representation

Election results

2022

 
 
 
 
 
 
 
 
 
|-
| colspan="8" bgcolor="#E9E9E9"|
|-

2017

2012

 
 
 
 
 
 
|-
| colspan="8" bgcolor="#E9E9E9"|
|-

2007

 
 
 
 
 
 
 
|-
| colspan="8" bgcolor="#E9E9E9"|
|-

2002

 
 
 
 
 
 
|-
| colspan="8" bgcolor="#E9E9E9"|
|-

1997

 
 
 
 
 
 
 
 
|-
| colspan="8" bgcolor="#E9E9E9"|
|-

Sources
 Official results of French elections from 1998: 

6